The 1909 Illinois Fighting Illini football team was an American football team that represented the University of Illinois during the 1909 college football season.  In their fourth season under head coach Arthur R. Hall, the Illini compiled a 5–2 record and finished in third place in the Western Conference. End Benjamin F. Baum was the team captain.

Schedule

References

Illinois
Illinois Fighting Illini football seasons
Illinois Fighting Illini football